The Union of Independent French Phonographic Producers (UPFI) is a trade organisation that brings together independent record labels and music distributors in France. Its headquarters are based in the nation's capital Paris.

Founded on 12 June 1986 as the Professional Association of Independent Phonographic Producers (APPI), the organisation changed the terms of its original statutes during its extraordinary general meeting of 8 June 1993. It was during the same meeting that the organisation changed its name to the UPFI.

Structure
In its current constitution, the UPFI says its current objectives are:
 to bring together and represent all persons or entities practising the profession of producers, publishers of sound and video recordings, and all those whose activities are linked with the production of these sound and video recordings;
 to organise, educate and protect their professional, economic, moral, national and international interests;
 generally, to do everything possible to ensure the promotion of production activities, and that of its members in particular, in France and abroad.

The UPFI is currently headed by its president Vincent Frèrebeau, who was elected during an annual general meeting held on 5 June 2014. He took over from Stephan Bourdoiseau, who headed the organisation from June 2004 to June 2008, and had taken over from Frèrebeau himself in June 2010 for a second term.

Members
The UPFI currently represents 78 independent record labels and music distributors within and outside France.

 ABS Bellissima
 Accéléra Son / Absolute Management
 Actes Sud
 Adima Productions
 Aircheology
 Ascot Music
 At (H)ome
 Atmosphériques
 Because Music
 Big Broz Recordz
 CH+
 Chris Music
 Citizen Records
 CMBM
 Count Melody
 Delphine Records
 Derrière Les Planches
 Din Records
 Discograph
 Discorama
 Disc'ambiance
 Disques Dom
 Dixiefrog
 Emma Productions
 label Entreprise
 Fargo Records
 Foolek Records
 Francis Dreyfus Music
 FT Music
 FuturePlay
 Gatkess
 Gorgone Productions
 Green United Music
 Happy Music
 Idol
 Infine
 JMS/Cream Records
 Johnny Williams Son
 Keltia Musique
 Kiui
 Kyrone
 La Ouache Production
 Le Village Vert
 Lusafrica
 Masq
 microqlima
 Mimesis Republic
 Monte-Carlo Records
 Mystic Rumba
 Nashvert Production
 Naïve Records
 NFFP Records
 No Format!
 Nouvelle Donne Productions
 Olympic Disk
 Outhere
 Panorama/AB Disques
 Peermusic
 PIAS
 Productions Jacques Canetti
 Productions Mary Josée
 Rue Bleue
 Still Muzik
 Stormy Music
 Studio du Moulin de Crampaux
 Tabata Music
 Teme
 Twin Fizz Records
 Tôt ou tard
 UGOP
 V Music Productions
 Verone Productions
 Victorie Music
 Volvox Music
 Vox Gramophone
 Wagram Music
 WTPL/Booster
 Yearling Productions
 Yotanka Productions

Administrative council
The administrative council (conseil d'administration) currently has 18 members, who are the heads of 18 of the 78 members of the organisation. The council's current members are:

 Hervé Bergerat (Masq)
 Julien Banes (La Ouache Production)
 Pascal Bittard (Idol)
 Laurent Bizot (No Format!)
 Stephan Bourdoiseau (Wagram Music)
 Emmanuel de Buretel (Because Music)
 Xavier Collin (WTPL)
 Béatrice Costermans (Naïve Records)
 Laurent Didailler (PIAS)
 Jean-Michel Doué (FuturePlay)
 Pascal Dumay (Outhere)
 Pierre Forgacs (Happy Music)
 Vincent Frèrebeau (Tôt ou tard)
 Olivier Lacourt (Discograph)
 Stéphane Laïck (At (H)ome)
 Olivier Lebeau (Volvox Music)
 Frédéric Temstet (FT Music)
 Marc Thonon (Atmosphériques)

Presidents
The UPFI has been headed by five different presidents since June 1993.
 Claude Berda (AB Disques): 1993–1997
 Jean-Michel Fava (AB Disques): 1997–2000
 Patrick Zelnik (Naïve Records): 2000–2004
 Stephan Bourdoiseau (Wagram Music): 2004–2008, 2010–2014
 Vincent Frèrebeau (Tôt ou tard): 2008–2010, 2014–present

Certification

The UPFI awards certifications at the request of each phonographic society. The submission of a certification is subject to a sales threshold, which must be certified by the organisation's accounting firm after audits with the label. As of 1 July 2009, the certification criteria are as follows:

References

External links
 UPFI official website

Music industry associations
Music organizations based in France
Organizations established in 1986